Meleveettil Muhammad Akbar (Malayalam: മേലേവീട്ടില്‍ മുഹമ്മദ് അക്ബര്‍) is an Islamic preacher and religious scholar from India.  Akbar used to be a schoolteacher in Malappuram, teaching physics, and was associated with the Mujahid Student Movement. Akbar never had any academic training as a Muslim scholar. He is the founder    Director of Niche of Truth, an Islamic dawa organization based in Kerala and the editor of Sneha Samvadam magazine published from Kochi, Kerala, India. Niche of Truth has created the first website in Malayalam, about the life of the Islamic prophet, Muhammad. The Cochin-based islamic dawa organization's objective is to present Islam as a comprehensive religion in front of India's pluralist society. 

He is the managing director of Peace International School, a chain of 13 schools run by the Peace Foundation. The chain came under controversy as it was found to be promoting communal division through its syllabus 

The Kerala government ordered closure of the Peace schools In January 2018  and issued a look out notice for Akbar. Kochi police arrested him on 25 February 2018.

MM Akbar has been granted bail by the court and currently all the peace schools are functioning normally. No material promoting communal division was found in the school syllabus by the High Court.

References

External links
 Muhammed Nabi.info (first Muhammad Nabi website in Malayalam)

Living people
1968 births
21st-century Indian Muslims
21st-century Muslim scholars of Islam